Michel Dancoisne-Martineau (born 5 December 1965) is the director of the French domains of Saint Helena. Since October 1990, he has been Honorary French Consul on the island.

Career 
Since 1987, Dancoisne-Martineau has been the manager of the three properties owned by the French Government on Saint Helena. Among other projects, he completed the restoration of Longwood Gardens to its 1821 state, using original documents from the Saint Helena archives to collect the original furniture.

From 1987 to 1998, Dancoisne-Martineau managed the historical reconstruction of the admiral's apartment at the Briars Pavilion, the former residence of Napoleon, which was completed in 2015. From 2010 to 2013, he managed, in partnership with the Fondation Napoléon, the "Save Longwood House" fundraising campaign. In 2008, he donated of 1.67 acres of land around the Briars to the French Government, to guarantee visitor access to the site.

In May 2011, he published Chroniques de Sainte-Hélène Atlantique Sud, a collection of accounts describing life on the island by some of the lesser-known characters of the days of Napoleon on the island.

From 2012 until 2014, he was consultant and architect's project manager for the rehabilitation of the National domain at Longwood (case n°7425)     
Between 2013 - 2016, he was commissioner, along with Emilie Robbe, of the scientific Committee for the exhibition "Napoleon at St Helena –at the Conquest of memory", from Wednesday 6 April to Sunday 24 July 2016 at the Musée de l'Armée - Hôtel national des Invalides.

For the bicentenary of Napoleon on St. Helena (2015-2021), he is publishing a history of Napoleon's time on Saint Helena, in a 12-volume bilingual French/English series. The story of his life was published in 2017 in "Je suis le Gardien du Tombeau vide", Flammarion 2017

Publications 
Je suis le Gardien du Tombeau vide – Ed.  Flammarion., paris, 2017
Saint Helena, an island under siege (15-17 October 1815) [Volume 2 of the 12 volumes series "Napoleon on  Saint Helena, the reef of an empire"]. Editions MDM  Productions Ltd, 2017
Napoleon & St. Helena (1800  – 15 October 1815) [Volume 1 of the 12 volumes series "Napoleon on  Saint Helena, the reef of an empire"]. Editions MDM  Productions Ltd, 2016
Contribution catalogue of the exhibition "Napoleon  at St Helena –at the Conquest of memory". Edition Gallimard, 2016
In napoleon’s footsteps on St. Helena,  the places of exile today – published in 2015 by Saint Helena  Napoleonic Heritage Limited
A story of masks, - study on the death masks of Napoleon – Magazine of the  Souvenir Napoléonien #489, May/June 2011
St-Helena island Chronicles,  South Atlantic – Ed. Perrin, Paris – 2011 
Contribution in Napoleon and the  Invalides, Collections of the Army’s Museum – Chapter "the two Tombs  of Napoleon" – Ed. Musée de  l'Armée - Editions de la Revue Napoleon, Paris – 2010
the today’s situation  of St.Helena, Magazine of the  Souvenir Napoléonien #482, February/March 2010
Napoleon’s  exile on St.Helena – bilingual edition from the “St.Helena Tourism office”, 2008
St-Helena island, then & Now – Cultural  project and book directed for the St-Helena Education department with the  Prince Andrew School students, Cape town, 2007
St.Helena, Memories’ Island –  director of the publication (together with Thierry Lentz & Bernard  Chevallier) – Ed. Fayard, Paris 2005
the Napoleonic Sites on St. Helena Island – Ed.  South Atlantic, 2002
official Poster for the Q5 (500 Years) Celebration of the discovery of St-Helena island made  out of 500 portraits of “Saints”
St.Helena, 500 Years of History - Photographer in the commemorative  leaflet published by the St.Helena Government in 2002 
Flowers from the Gardens of Napoleon on  St-Helena island – 2 volumes of the St.Helena endemics, 1999 (volume 1) & 2000 (volume 2)
Guide of the French Properties – Ed.  Solomon & Co., St-Helena island, 1995

Awards 
2016 -Knight of the National Order of Legion of Honor
2015 - Medal of Honor For the French Ministry of Foreign office (Bronze) 2012 - Knight of the National Order of Merit (of France) 2011 - First Empire Prize of the Fondation Napoléon 2005 - Knighthood of Arts And Literature 
2012 - Knight of the National Order of Merit (of France) 
2011 - First Empire Prize of the Fondation Napoléon
2005 - Knighthood of Arts And Literature by the Ministry of Culture and Communication

References

External links 
Michel Dancoisne-Martineau: a St Helena passion
Domaines nationaux de Sainte-Hélène
Michel Dancoisne-Martineau is awarded the Légion d’Honneur
Napoléon - Le reclus de Sainte-Hélène
A Sainte-Hélène, Michel Dancoisne-Martineau, gardien du temple napoléonien
Sainte-Hélène: le garde-mémoire de Napoléon
"Je vis depuis trente ans isolé au milieu de l'Atlantique Sud et je suis parfaitement épanoui"
Le consul de France à Sainte-Hélène : «L'ennui était mortel pour Napoléon»
PressReader.com - Digital Newspaper & Magazine Subscriptions
PressReader.com - Digital Newspaper & Magazine Subscriptions
A Sainte-Hélène, Michel Dancoisne-Martineau, gardien du temple napoléonien
Sainte-Hélène: le garde-mémoire de Napoléon

1965 births
Living people
French writers
Saint Helenian people